Gatelys Peoples Store was a department store at 11201 S. Michigan Avenue, in the Roseland neighborhood of Chicago. It was described as "the biggest store on Michigan Avenue".

James Gately purchased the Peoples Store in 1917 and added his name. The store thrived until the late 1960s, when the economy of the area changed. The Michigan Avenue store closed in 1981, while another store in suburban Tinley Park lasted until 1994.

The mostly abandoned structure in Roseland, which ranged from three to five stories in height, was engulfed by an extra-alarm fire during the early morning hours of June 7, 2019. Demolition crews began razing the structure later that day.

References

Buildings and structures in Chicago